State Route 202 (SR 202) is a south–north state highway in the southern part of the U.S. state of Georgia. Its routing lies within portions of Thomas and Colquitt counties.

Route description
The route begins at an intersection with US 19/SR 3/SR 300 north of Thomasville, in Thomas County. It heads due north to a short concurrency with SR 188. A little ways north of the end of the concurrency, the route enters Colquitt County. It continues heading north until it meets its northern terminus, and intersection with SR 111 southwest of Moultrie.

Major intersections

See also

References

External links

 
 Georgia Roads (Routes 201 - 220)

202
Transportation in Thomas County, Georgia
Transportation in Colquitt County, Georgia